Thirsty Merc are an Australian pop rock band formed in 2002 by Rai Thistlethwayte, Phil Stack (bass guitar), Karl Robertson (drums), and Matthew Baker (guitar). In 2004, Baker was replaced by Sean Carey, who was, in turn, replaced by Matt Smith in 2010. Thirsty Merc have released one extended play, First Work (September 2003), and five studio albums: Thirsty Merc (August 2004), Slideshows (April 2007), Mousetrap Heart (June 2010), Shifting Gears (September 2015), and Celebration (June 2022). The band have sold over 200,000 albums, toured extensively around Australia, and received national radio airplay for their tracks.

In June 2005, Billboards Christie Eliezer felt their debut album showed "electric rock-, classical- and jazz-influenced pop [that] appealed to Australian radio programmers". The work reached the top-20 on the ARIA Albums Chart and was certified platinum by ARIA for shipment of 70,000 units by the end of 2005. Slideshows peaked at No. 4 in Australia—their highest position. It reached No. 38 on the New Zealand Albums Chart; however, Thirsty Merc had attained No. 29 in that market. The group were nominated for four ARIA Awards in 2005, and the Thistlethwayte-written track "20 Good Reasons" was nominated for Song of the Year at the APRA Music Awards of 2008. From 2006, their song "In the Summertime" was the opening theme for the Australian TV reality show Bondi Rescue.

History
Three of the founding members of Thirsty Merc—Matthew Baker, Karl Robertson, and Phil Stack—had played together in various bands in Dubbo, a regional New South Wales city. In 1996, Drown was formed with Baker on guitar, Robertson on drums, Peter Jamieson on vocals, and Stack on bass guitar. By 1998 Baker, Jamieson and Stack had split to form Twenty Two and then moved to Sydney. In 2002, Baker and Stack returned to Dubbo where Rai Thistlethwayte, from Sydney, as lead singer (later also on guitar and keyboards) and Stack worked as a live jazz duo and session musicians. They were joined by Baker and Robertson, and formed a pop rock band, initially called Thirsty; soon after they moved to Sydney and were renamed, Thirsty Merc. The band's name came from Thistlethwayte's 1979 Mercedes-Benz 280SEL, which was a gas-guzzler.

In October 2006 Thistlethwayte described his jazz and R&B background to MusicFix and the band's sound as "rock Sinatra" where "[t]he outlook, I guess, is about being a young person in today's society ... being an Australian in an American-ised, Britain-ised kind of world, where you're trying to stay true to yourself". Baker added "We contrived to make it not contrived ... Rai was all for originality in his own vision and so were we".

A car accident on 22 September 2015 at Streatham, Victoria during a Thirsty Merc tour killed the band's stage manager and injured drummer Mick Skelton.

First Work
Thirsty Merc's first extended play, First Work, was released on 8 September 2003 by the band's own label, Don't Music and was distributed by Warner Music Australia. The five-track CD was independently recorded during downtime at a studio where Thistlethwayte worked. The EP reached the top 100 on the ARIA Singles Chart; and its lead single, "Wasting Time", achieved radio airplay on national radio stations, Triple J and Nova. The self-funded music video for the single was broadcast on Channel [V], and became the 'ripe clip of the week'. At the time of recording the EP they were without a label. After extensive gigging around Sydney's pubs, representatives from Warner had signed the band in June 2003, for the release of the EP and the follow up single, "Emancipate Myself", which was a reworked version of the EP track. It was issued in April 2004 and The Ages Andrew Murfett declared that "this bitter tirade wrapped in melodic hooks has become one of the biggest local radio successes of the year".

Debut studio album
On 16 August 2004 Thirsty Merc issued their debut studio album, the self-titled, Thirsty Merc, which was co-produced by the group with Lindsay Gravina (The Living End, Magic Dirt). Also that month, prior to a national tour in support of its release, Baker left and was replaced on guitar by Sean Carey (ex-Midnight Swim), whom they had met when playing a support slot to his group at a Kings Cross venue, Club 77. The album spent 48 weeks on the ARIA Albums Chart Top 50, peaking at No. 15, and launched the band in the Australian mainstream. dB Magazines Kelly Parish observed "[e]ven though the band's sound is predominantly rock, it has been influenced by more traditional flavours ... they have developed a very wide audience which embraces both the alternative and mainstream camps". Thirsty Merc reached No. 29 on New Zealand's RIANZ Albums Chart. It was recorded and mixed on 2 inch tape, and then further mixed by Gravina at his Birdland Studios.

Five singles were released from Thirsty Merc: "Emancipate Myself", "My Completeness" (August 2004), "Someday, Someday" (December), "In the Summertime" (April 2005), and "When the Weather Is Fine" (September). All five appeared in the ARIA Singles Chart top 50, with the highest charting, "Someday, Someday" reaching No. 19. Of these singles only "In the Summertime" reached the top 50 in New Zealand, where it peaked at No. 12. In June 2005 Billboards Christie Eliezer felt the album showed "eclectic rock-, classical- and jazz-influenced pop [that] appealed to Australian radio programmers". The album was due for United States and European release in early 2006 on Atlantic Records.

"In the Summertime" was nominated at the ARIA Music Awards of 2005 for "Best Video", while "Someday, Someday" was nominated for "Single of the Year", "Best Group", and "Best Pop Release". At the ceremony in October, the group performed "Someday, Someday". In 2006 Carey described the group's style to Jet Magazine, it was "Just be yourself" and "about being young and living in Australia. We’re not trying to be 50 Cent or anything, we’re all just boys from the country, just trying to move into the city and make our way". He listed Evermore, Crowded House, Foo Fighters and Cold Chisel as his favourite bands. In February 2007 they supported Ozzy Osbourne on the Australian leg of his national tour.

Slideshows
Thirsty Merc's second album, Slideshows, was issued on 21 April 2007 via Warner Music Australia. It became the band's most successful release yet, peaking at No. 4 in Australia, although it was less successful in New Zealand, only reaching No. 38. To support the release of Slideshows, Thirsty Merc toured Australia, playing an album tour in theatres nationally and then various regional tours, the biggest of which had 38 shows booked across seven weeks. The album's first single, "20 Good Reasons" (March 2007), reached No. 4 in Australia and No. 17 in New Zealand. In June they supported Evermore on a tour of New Zealand, showcasing their "unique blend of pop rock dance-able balladry". The next three singles appeared in the top 100 in Australia, "The Hard Way" (September), "Those Eyes" (December), and "Homesick" (May 2008).

The band's main songwriter, Thistlethwayte, inadvertently wrote a "break-up album", which The Sydney Morning Heralds Brett Winterford noted was unusual, "that the articulate and intelligent 27-year-old has strung together 12 such stock-standard, radio-friendly songs about broken hearts". Thistlethwayte described his influences: "Jazz taught me about spontaneity ... Central to jazz is improvisation. It's also great to get that knowledge of theory, an understanding of the geeky side of music" and writing advertising jingles had showed him how to "do a lot of things in differing genres and recording styles—but had to try to be authentic about it". After writing the tracks, the other members "choose the songs that had the ultimate emotional impact".

Mousetrap Heart

On 14 January 2010 Thirsty Merc announced that Carey had left the band and was replaced on guitar by Matt Smith, from afrobeat and reggae band, The Strides. Carey wanted to work as a record producer and spend more time with his wife. On 18 June 2010 Thirsty Merc released their third album, Mousetrap Heart, which was recorded mostly in Los Angeles with Matt Wallace co-producing, while two tracks were produced in Melbourne with Gravina. Bernard Zuel of The Sydney Morning Herald opined that "we buy, or actively avoid, songs that excite a response in us but radio wants songs that fit in, that don't provoke strong responses, that offend the fewest people ... this [album] is a collection of extremely professional, well-considered, carefully targeted songs whose key performance indicators are ticked off one by one in a manner so efficient you suspect band meetings must have an agenda, notes secretary and double-cream biscuits for elevenses".

The band toured nationally in July 2010 to support the album, while its lead single, the title track, had appeared in May and charted in the Top 30 on the ARIA Singles Chart. The second single, "Tommy and Krista", was released in September, which peaked at No. 10 in New Zealand. Another single, "All My Life", was featured in the promotional clips for the 2010 AFL grand final. Its music video was directed by Adrian Van de Velde and was shot in early October in Bangkok, Thailand. The narrative is a 'heroic love' set on a local military base and features Russian model-actress Maria Mazikova, together with 50 Thai army troops, an Iroquois helicopter, and a Chinook helicopter. In November Lip Magazines Shannon Andreucci reviewed a live gig, "[they] are certainly no Pixies, Beatles or Sex Pistols. They're not breaking any rules or boundaries in the revolutionary world of rock music. In fact they are perfectly happy and capable of playing within the parameters of radio friendly and commercially safe pop rock. But one thing is for sure; they go the extra mile in giving a charmingly refined and hearty live performance and that in itself should be commended".

Celebration
On 30 May 2022 Thirsty Merc announced on their official instagram page they will release their next studio album, Celebration, on 17 June 2022. This will be accompanied with a national tour, Celebration 2022, taking place between July and September of the same year. The album features reimagined covers of well known Australian songs from different decades. The lead single, released with the album announcement, is a cover of Daryl Braithwaite's As the Days Go By. Other confirmed songs include Who Listens To The Radio, That’s When I Think of You, Bad Habits and The Seekers's 1966 hit Hey There, Georgy Girl.

Members
Current members
 Rai Thistlethwayte – lead vocals, rhythm guitar, piano, keyboards (2002–present)
 Phil Stack – bass guitar, double bass, backing vocals (2002–present)
 Matt Smith – lead guitar (2010–present)

Former members
 Matt Baker – lead guitar, backing vocals (2002–2004)
 Sean Carey – lead guitar, backing vocals (2004–2009)
 Karl Robertson – drums, percussion (2002–2014)

Discography

Studio albums

Extended plays

Singles

Awards and nominations

APRA Music Awards
The APRA Awards are presented annually from 1982 by the Australasian Performing Right Association (APRA).

|-
| 2006 || "Someday, Someday" (Rai Thistlethwayte) – Thirsty Merc || Most Played Australian Work || 
|-
| rowspan="2"|2008 || rowspan="2"|"20 Good Reasons" (Rai Thistlethwayte) – Thirsty Merc || Song of the Year || 
|-
| Most Played Australian Work ||

ARIA Music Awards
The ARIA Music Awards are presented annually from 1987 by the Australian Recording Industry Association (ARIA). Thirsty Merc have received four nominations.

|-
|rowspan="4"| 2005 || "In the Summertime" – Adrian Van De Velde – Thirsty Merc || Best Video || 
|-
| rowspan="3"| "Someday, Someday" || Single of the Year || 
|-
| Best Group || 
|-
| Best Pop Release ||

Notes

External links
 

Australian pop music groups
Musical quartets
Musical groups from Sydney